Old Wives Tales (also Old Wives' Tales) was a feminist bookstore in the Mission Dolores neighborhood of San Francisco. It was founded on October 31, 1976 by Carol Seajay and Paula Wallace, a lesbian couple. It closed permanently in October 1995.

History 
On October 31, 1976, Old Wives Tales opened at 532 Valencia Street, funded by a loan from the San Francisco Feminist Federal Credit Union. It initially operated as a partnership between the founders. In 1978, Carol Seajay and Paula Wallace broke up, with Wallace moving away. The bookstore was moved to a new location at 1009 Valencia Street after the breakup, and Seajay restructured it to run as a worker cooperative.

In 1983, members of the worker collective incorporated Old Wives Tales as a nonprofit. Seajay resigned the same year.

In early 1991, the bookstore halved its floor space as a result of financial difficulties. In August 1993, Old Wives Tales reported additional financial trouble, with the collective seeking $25,000 in loans to continue operating the bookstore.

References 

1976 establishments in California
1995 disestablishments in California
Feminist bookstores
Worker cooperatives of the United States
Feminism in California